The 1992 Cork Intermediate Football Championship was the 57th staging of the Cork Intermediate Football Championship since its establishment by the Cork County Board in 1909. The draw for the opening round fixtures took place on 15 December 1991.

The final was played on 13 September 1992 at Páirc Uí Chaoimh in Cork, between Mallow and Kilmurry, in what was their first ever meeting in a final. Mallow won the match by 1-13 to 2-09 to claim their first ever championship title.

Mallow's Ronan Sheehan was the championship's top scorer with 2-15.

Results

First round

Second round

Quarter-finals

Semi-finals

Final

Championship statistics

Top scorers

Overall

In a single game

References

Cork Intermediate Football Championship